is a Japanese alpine skier. She competed in the women's slalom at the 2006 Winter Olympics.

References

1985 births
Living people
Japanese female alpine skiers
Olympic alpine skiers of Japan
Alpine skiers at the 2006 Winter Olympics
Universiade gold medalists for Japan
Universiade medalists in alpine skiing
Competitors at the 2009 Winter Universiade
21st-century Japanese women